The NBA G League Most Improved Player is an annual NBA G League (previously known D-League or Development League) award given since the 2009–10 season. The award honors the player who demonstrated the most significant improvement over the course of the regular season. The league's head coaches determine the award by voting and it is usually presented to the honoree during the playoffs.

No player has been named the Most Improved Player more than once. By position, guards have dominated the award, having won in all but two years since its inception. Mildon Ambres was the inaugural winner while playing for the Idaho Stampede.

Winners

See also
NBA Most Improved Player Award

References

External links
D-League Most Improved Player Award Winners at basketball-reference.com

National Basketball Association lists
Improved
Awards established in 2010
Most improved awards